Lucas Bradley Falcão Cini (born October 21, 1999), or simply known as Lucas Falcão or Lucas Cini, is a Brazilian footballer who plays as a forward for Greek Super League 2 side Irodotos.

Career
Cini joined United Soccer League side Portland Timbers 2 after spending time with the Portland Timbers academy. His first appearance came on 5 May 2017 vs. Seattle Sounders FC 2. In total, however, he only made two appearances for Timbers 2.

He then joined Spanish side CD Estepona FS in the winter of 2019.

On 28 June 2019, he joined Regionalliga side FC Viktoria Berlin. He made ten league appearances for Viktoria Berlin in the shortened 2020–21 season, and scored three goals. In the shortened season, Viktoria Berlin won all 11 of their games and won promotion to the 3. Liga.

References

External links

1999 births
Living people
American soccer players
Portland Timbers 2 players
Association football forwards
FC Viktoria 1889 Berlin players
3. Liga players
Regionalliga players